Brickellia desertorum is a species of flowering plant in the family Asteraceae known by the common names desert brickellbush and desert brickellia. It is native to Mexico, Central America, the West Indies, and the southwestern United States (the Mojave and Sonoran Deserts of California, Nevada, and Arizona).

The small, toothed, oval-shaped leaves are up to 1.2 centimeters long. The inflorescences at the end of stem branches contain clusters of flower heads, each about a centimeter long and lined with greenish, purplish, or yellowish phyllaries. At the tip of the head are 8 to 12 tubular disc florets.

The fruit is a hairy cylindrical achene 2 or 3 millimeters long with a pappus of bristles.

References

External links
Jepson Manual Treatment
United States Department of Agriculture Plants Profile
 C.Michael Hogan, ed. 2010.  Brickellia desertorum. Encyclopedia of Life
Calphotos Photo gallery, University of California

desertorum
Flora of the Southwestern United States
Plants described in 1892